Thomas James (born c. 1555, died 23 January 1619) was an English merchant and politician who sat in the House of Commons for Bristol in 1604-11 and 1614.

James was the son of Edward James of Wollaston. He became a merchant of Bristol and was Sheriff in 1591. He was elected Member of Parliament for Bristol in 1604 and was also mayor of Bristol in 1605. In 1614 he was re-elected MP for Bristol.

References

1550s births
Year of birth uncertain
1619 deaths
High Sheriffs of Bristol
English merchants
Mayors of Bristol
16th-century merchants
17th-century merchants
16th-century English businesspeople
17th-century English businesspeople
English MPs 1604–1611
English MPs 1614